Oleg Nikolayevich Polyarush (born 10 September 1977) is a Ukrainian professional footballer. In 2009, he played in the Russian Second Division for FC Bataysk-2007.

External links
 

1977 births
Living people
Ukrainian footballers
Association football midfielders
Ukrainian expatriate footballers
Expatriate footballers in Russia
Expatriate footballers in Belarus
FC Hoverla Uzhhorod players
FC CSKA Kyiv players
FC Arsenal Kyiv players
SC Tavriya Simferopol players
FC Ural Yekaterinburg players
FC Torpedo Minsk players
FC Nyva Vinnytsia players
MFC Mykolaiv players
FC Taganrog players